Stanley Albert Schmidt  (born March 7, 1944) is an American science fiction author and editor. Between 1978 and 2012 he served as editor of Analog Science Fiction and Fact magazine.

Biography
Schmidt was born in Cincinnati, Ohio and graduated from the University of Cincinnati in 1966. He then attended Case Western Reserve University, where he completed his PhD in physics in 1969. After receiving his degree, he became a professor at Heidelberg College in Tiffin, Ohio, teaching physics, astronomy, and science fiction. Schmidt was editor of Analog Science Fiction and Fact magazine from 1978 to his retirement on 29 August 2012. Additionally, he has served as a member of the Board of Advisers for the National Space Society and the Science Fiction Museum and Hall of Fame and was Guest of Honor at BucConeer, the 1998 World Science Fiction Convention in Baltimore, Maryland.

Fiction
His first publication was "A Flash of Darkness" (Analog, September 1968); his first novel was The Sins of the Fathers (serialized in Analog from November 1973 to January 1974); and his first book was Newton and the Quasi-Apple in 1975.

One of his most recent novels, Argonaut (2002), shows an alien invasion from a new angle.

Hugo Award nominations
He was nominated for the Hugo Award for Best Professional Editor every year from 1980 through 2006 (its final year), and for the Hugo Award for Best Editor Short Form every year from 2007 (its first year) through 2013. He won the Hugo for the first time in 2013. In 2013 he was awarded a Special Committee Award for his editorial work.

Bibliography

Novels
 
 
 
 
Kyyra series
 
  [Collected short fiction; see below]

Short fiction
Collections
 
 Generation Gap and Other Stories (2002)
Stories
 The Reluctant Ambassadors (1968)
 . . . And Comfort to the Enemy (1969)
 Lost Newton (1970)
 May the Best Man Win (1971)
 The Unreachable Stars (1971)
 The Prophet (1972)
 His Loyal Opposition (1976)
 Panic (1978)
 A Midsummer Newt's Dream (1979)
 Camouflage (1981)
 Tweedlioop (1981)
 Mascots (1982)
 War of Independence (1982)
 The Folks Who Live on the Hill (1984)
 Floodgate (1988)
 The Man on the Cover (1990)
 Worthsayer (1992)
 Not Even a Chimney (1993)
 Johnny Birdseed (1993)
 The Parallels of Penzance (1998) with Michael A. Burstein
 Good Intentions (1998) with Jack McDevitt
 Generation Gap (2000)
 The Emperor's Revenge (2002)
Lifeboat Earth series
 A Thrust of Greatness (1976)
 Caesar Clark (1977)
 Pinocchio (1977)
 Dark Age (1977)
 The Promised Land (1978)
 Second Interlude (1978)
 First Interlude (1978)
 Third Interlude (1978)
 Fourth Interlude (1978)

Anthologies (edited)
 Unknown (1988)
 Unknown Worlds: Tales from Beyond (1988) with Martin H. Greenberg
 Islands in the Sky: Bold New Ideas for Colonizing Space (1996) with Robert M. Zubrin
 Roads Not Taken: Tales of Alternate History (1998) with Gardner Dozois
Analog anthologies
 Analog Yearbook II (1981)
 The Analog Anthology #1 (1980) also appeared as: Analog's Golden Anniversary Anthology (1981) and Fifty Years of the Best Science Fiction From Analog (1981)
 The Analog Anthology #2 (1982) also appeared as: Analog: Readers' Choice (1982)
 Analog's Children of the Future (1982)
 Analog's Lighter Side (1982)
 Analog: Writers' Choice (1983)
 Analog's War and Peace (1983)
 Aliens from Analog (1983)
 Analog: Writers' Choice, Volume II (1984)
 Analog's From Mind to Mind: Tales of Communication (1984)
 Analog's Expanding Universe (1986)
 6 Decades: The Best of Analog (1986)

Nonfiction
 Writing Science Fiction and Fantasy (1991) with Ian Randal Strock and Gardner Dozois and Tina Lee and Sheila Williams
 Aliens and Alien Societies: A Writer's Guide to Creating Extraterrestrial Life-Forms (1996)
 Which Way to the Future?: Selected Essays From Analog (2001)

Notes

External links
Stanley Schmidt's SFWA biography
Analog Science Fiction and Fact magazine
Stanley Schmidt's homepage at SFWA.org
2012 interview at Locus
20-minute interview with Stanley Schmidt, 12/08

1944 births
Living people
21st-century American physicists
20th-century American novelists
21st-century American novelists
American male novelists
American science fiction writers
Writers of books about writing fiction
University of Cincinnati alumni
Case Western Reserve University alumni
Heidelberg University (Ohio)
Writers from Cincinnati
Science fiction editors
Science teachers
Analog Science Fiction and Fact people
Hugo Award-winning editors
American male short story writers
20th-century American short story writers
21st-century American short story writers
20th-century American male writers
21st-century American male writers
Novelists from Ohio